Mount Minsi forms the Pennsylvania side of the Delaware Water Gap, and is the eastern extent of the Blue Mountain. It is composed of sandstone and conglomerates of the Shawangunk Formation.

Hiking 

The easiest route to the summit of Minsi is by way of the Appalachian Trail, from the Lake Lenape trailhead near the town of Delaware Water Gap. The Mount Minsi fire road shares and parallels parts of the same route on the same northwest slopes. Both travel about  round trip, and gain  of elevation.

Climbing 

The band of exposed metaquartzite cliffs on east face of Minsi hold a number of traditional climbing routes. The earliest of these were put up in 1975, and established routes range from 5.0 to 5.12+. Winter can offer some mixed and ice climbing as well.

Gallery

References

External links 
 Rock Climbing Routes: ...Delaware_Water Gap (Mt. Minsi) on Rockclimbing.com.

Climbing areas of the United States
Mountains of Pennsylvania
Landforms of Monroe County, Pennsylvania